John Volts (1825–1904?) was a British critic, philosopher and writer. He lived for part of his life in the United States.

He was the author of In the Court of the Dragon (1897) as well as a number of other works.

Notes

External links 
 Works by John Volts at Open Library

1825 births
English writers
1904 deaths
English male writers